Leptoceroidea is a superfamily of caddisflies.

References 

Insect superfamilies
Integripalpia